Their One Love is a 1915 American silent short action drama film, directed by Jack Harvey. It stars Madeline Fairbanks, Marion Fairbanks, and Robert Wilson.

Plot
Two sisters love the same man, who later dies in the American Civil War.

Cast
 Madeline Fairbanks as Madeline
 Marion Fairbanks as Marion
 Robert Wilson as Jack, the soldier
 Charles Emerson as Jack as a boy

Commentary
The twin sisters interact with their love interest as a whole, when Jack is addressing one sister she ensures that he next turns to interact with the other. After Jack dies, the two sisters grow old together.

References

External links

1915 films
American silent short films
American action drama films
1910s action drama films
Films directed by Jack Harvey
Thanhouser Company films
Articles containing video clips
1915 short films
American black-and-white films
1915 drama films
1910s American films
Silent American drama films
1910s English-language films
Silent action drama films